Village of Lisle-Benedictine University Sports Complex is a facility for football, soccer, baseball, softball, and track and field. The multimillion-dollar sports-complex on the campus of Benedictine University, in the Village of Lisle, Illinois is a collaborative effort between the university and the village.
Located just outside Chicago, the sports-complex is home to the sport teams of Benedictine University Athletics.
It was the home stadium of Chicago Red Stars women's soccer club from 2011 to 2015.

The stadium was home to Major League Lacrosse's Chicago Machine in their 2006 inaugural season. Local high schools host football and soccer games in the stadium. A baseball stadium and a softball stadium are also included in the complex. The baseball stadium is home to Benedictine University Eagles, the DuPage County Hounds
of the Midwest Collegiate League, and the DuPage Pistol Shrimp of the Prospect League.

Stadium complex

The 3,000-seat main stadium for American football and soccer is also a fine athletics facility with an artificial playing surface, a nine-lane track, electronic scoreboard and message board, and electric lights. The main press box, four luxury suites, and viewing sundecks are above the seating gallery.

Natural grass practice fields and throwing venues for baseball and softball are directly adjacent to the main stadium. The baseball stadium seats 1,000, including 800 chairs, and has handicap accessible areas on the main concourse. The baseball field measures 325 feet to the outfield fence. Oversized dugouts allow for maximum player comfort. The stadium features a large electronic scoreboard and message board, and a public address system provides coverage to the stands and concourse.

The sports complex was built by Walsh Construction, and the architect was DLR Group.

The complex was completed in November 2004.

Images

See also
 Benedictine University
 Village of Lisle, Illinois
 Chicago Red Stars

References

Benedictine Eagles
Benedictine Eagles football
American football venues in Illinois
Athletics (track and field) venues in Illinois
Baseball venues in Illinois
Former Major League Lacrosse venues
College baseball venues in the United States
College lacrosse venues in the United States
College football venues
College softball venues in the United States
College soccer venues in the United States
College track and field venues in the United States
Lacrosse venues in Illinois
Multi-purpose stadiums in the United States
Soccer venues in Illinois
Softball venues in Illinois
Ultimate (sport) venues
2004 establishments in Illinois
Sports venues completed in 2004